Off On Off (Hangul: 오프온오프, stylized as offonoff) is a South Korean duo under HIGHGRND in Seoul, South Korea. They debuted on September 21, 2016, with "Bath".

Members
Colde – vocalist
0Channel – producer, DJ（New Stage Name – EOH）

Discography

Studio albums

Single albums

Singles

References

Musical groups from Seoul
Musical groups established in 2016
2016 establishments in South Korea
South Korean musical duos